Pseudonocardia yunnanensis is a bacterium from the genus of Pseudonocardia.

References

Pseudonocardia
Bacteria described in 1991